Dawanne Devi  is a village development committee in Nawalparasi District in the Lumbini Zone of southern Nepal. At the time of the 1991 Nepal census it had a population of 10,833 people living in 2058 individual households. The place derives its name from Daunne Devi Temple.

References

Populated places in Parasi District